Rodolfo Brindisi (1932-2009) was an Argentine actor who appeared in film and television in Argentina between 1970 and 2003.

In 1971 he appeared in the musical Balada para un mochilero directed by Carlos Rinaldi, which starred José Marrone.

References

External links
 

Argentine male film actors
1932 births
2009 deaths